Konkomba–Nanumba conflict (also known as the Guinea fowl war) was a tribal war in Northern Ghana in 1994. It was fought between the Konkomba versus the Nanumba, Dagomba and Gonja tribes on the other side. The basis of the war were tribal claims over land ownership.  

At least 1000 and as many as 2000 people were killed during the conflict, while 150,000 people were displaced as part of the dispute. Some of the displaced individuals fled to Togo. The Rawlings government was able to slow the conflict by imploring methods that quelled tensions during the fight, eventually leading to much of the conflict being resolved towards the end of 2015.

See also 
 Ethnic conflict in Ghana

References

Conflicts in Ghana